{{automatic taxobox
|image = Flower & flower buds I IMG 2257.jpg
|image_caption = Nyctanthes arbor-tristis
|taxon = Myxopyreae
|authority =
|subdivision_ranks = Genera
|subdivision = DimetraMyxopyrumNyctanthes}}

Myxopyreae is a tribe of flowering plants in the olive family, Oleaceae.

Genera
 Dimetra Kerr
 Myxopyrum Blume
 Nyctanthes'' L.

References

 
Asterid tribes